The Constitution of Morocco is the supreme law of the Kingdom of Morocco. The constitution defines Morocco as a constitutional monarchy and lays out the fundamental rights of Moroccan citizens, it also defines the basis and structures of government, the council of ministers, and the parliament. 

The first Constitution of Morocco was adopted in 1962, 6 years after the country regained independence. From and following that event, the King, Mohamed V, worked for the establishment of political and constitutional institutions. The National Advisory Council originally created the legislation text governing public freedoms and freedom of expression, known as the Dahir, which was enacted on November 15, 1959. In 1960, the Constitutional Council was established, and the first Constitution was proposed on November 18, 1962. This draft was ratified through a referendum on December 7, 1962, and was finally promulgated one week later, on December 14.

2011 referendum 
A 2011 Moroccan constitutional referendum was held in Morocco on 1 July 2011. It was called in response to the protests that took place earlier in the year demanding democratic reforms. A commission was to draft proposals by June 2011. A draft released on 17 June foresaw the following changes:
 Requiring the King to name a Prime Minister from the largest party in Parliament;
 Handing a number of rights from the monarch to the PM, including dissolution of parliament;
 Allowing parliament to grant amnesty, previously a privilege of the monarch;
 Making Amazigh an official language alongside Arabic

The changes were reportedly approved by 98.49% of voters. Despite protest movements calling for a boycott of the referendum, government officials claimed turnout was 72.65%.

Following the referendum, early parliamentary elections were then held on 25 November 2011.

Results of 2011 referendum

See also
Moroccan constitutional referendum, 1962
Moroccan constitutional referendum, 1992
Moroccan constitutional referendum, 2011
History of Morocco#Reign of Mohammed VI (since 1999)

References

External links
 Full text of the 2011 constitution in English (PDF version)
 Full text of the 2011 constitution of Morocco in Berber and Arabic
 Full text of the 1996 constitution in Arabic, English, and French
 Full text of the 1996–2011 constitution (French)

Morocco
Government of Morocco
Law of Morocco
Politics of Morocco